The SNCF Class BB 16100 electric locomotives were converted from class BB 16000s by fitting TDM push-pull equipment to work the Paris Nord to St. Quentin/Amiens services as well as Paris St Lazare - Rouen.

Conversions
 16101 from 16004
 16102 from 16017
 16103 from 16046
 16104 from 16040
 16105 from 16014
 16106 from 16009
 16107 from 16048
 16108 from 16026
 16109 from 16023
 16110 from 16035
 16111 from 16016
 16112 from 16010
 16113 from 16030
 16114 from 16062
 16115 from 16060

References

MTE locomotives
Bo′Bo′ locomotives
16100
Railway locomotives introduced in 1991
25 kV AC locomotives
Standard gauge electric locomotives of France

Passenger locomotives